American singer Tank has released ten studio albums, three extended play (EP), two mixtape and 28 singles. According to Billboard, Tank has sold 1.76 million albums in the U.S. as of 2013.

Albums

Studio albums

Collaboration albums

EPs

Mixtapes

Singles

As lead artist 

Notes

As featured artist

Guest appearances

References

Pop music discographies
Rhythm and blues discographies
Discographies of American artists